William Charles Gillespie (22 November 1894 Surry Hills, Sydney NSW – 11 September 1945) was an Australian rugby league footballer who played in the 1910s and 1920s.

Playing career
Gillespie played for the South Sydney Rabbitohs from 1920 to 1923. In an article written shortly after Gillespie's death in 1945, sportswriter W.F. Corbett (the younger), wrote "Gillespie was called 'Tiger' because of his fierce tackling", noting also that he "was one of the lightest men big football has ever known, for he scaled only about 8st. 9lbs (55 kg)".

Tiger Gillespie captained the 1923 team to the grand final, where the Rabbitohs were runners-up to Easts. He played for NSW against Queensland in 1921, and toured with the NSW side to New Zealand in September 1922.

References

1894 births
1945 deaths
Australian rugby league players
Newtown Jets players
New South Wales rugby league team players
Rugby league five-eighths
Rugby league centres
Rugby league players from Sydney
South Sydney Rabbitohs captains
South Sydney Rabbitohs players